Here is a list of notable people associated with Bard College in Annandale-on-Hudson, New York. It includes graduates, attendees, and faculty of the college.

Alumni

Arts

Dance
 Arthur Aviles, dancer and choreographer

Film, Television and Theatre
 Raphael Bob-Waksberg, actor, producer, writer (BoJack Horseman)
 Ashim Ahluwalia, filmmaker
 Anne Bogart, theater director
 Jordan Bridges, actor
 Elliot Caplan, filmmaker 
 Salvador Carrasco, film director (The Other Conquest)
 Gia Coppola, film director
 Chevy Chase, comedian, writer, and television and film actor
 Blythe Danner, actress
 Theodore J. Flicker, sculptor/film director
 Lola Glaudini, actor (The Sopranos)
 Griffin Gluck
 Wynne Greenwood
Adrian Grenier, actor (Entourage)
 Christopher Guest, actor/director (This is Spinal Tap, Waiting for Guffman, Best in Show)
 Larry Hagman, actor
 K8 Hardy
 Todd Haynes, filmmaker
 Jonah Hill, Actor
 Peter Hobbs, actor
 Gaby Hoffmann, actor
 Hellin Kay, filmmaker and photographer
 Lola Kirke, actress
 Howard Koch, screenwriter (Casablanca, Letter from an Unknown Woman)
 Annie Korzen, actress, comedian and writer.
 Rhoda Levine, choreographer, theatre and opera director (NYC Opera) Play it By Ear, children's book writer
 Olde English, sketch comedy group
 Adam Conover, comedian, writer, and television host
 Tracy Nelson, actress
 Ellen Parker, actress, the Guiding Light
 Jeff Preiss, filmmaker
 Rosalie Purvis, theater director
 Marianne Rendón, actress
 Peter Sarsgaard, actor
 Eric Schaeffer, writer, director, actor
 Peter Stone, playwright
 Michael Tolkin, filmmaker, novelist
 Lana Wachowski, film and television director, writer and producer
 Alexandra Wentworth, actor/comedian
 Sherman Yellen, screenwriter/playwright/lyricist; political essayist on Huffington Post and The Environmentalist
 Yang Jin-mo, South Korean film editor

Music
 John Olson, musician in Wolf Eyes
 Walter Becker, musician and co-founder of Steely Dan
 Ran Blake, pianist
 Liv Bruce, musician in PWR BTTM
 Knox Chandler, musician
 Francis Bean Cobain, musician and daughter of the late Kurt Cobain from Nirvana (band)    
 Carl Davis, composer and conductor
 Drop the Lime, electronic dance musician
 Donald Fagen, musician and co-founder of Steely Dan
 Chris Glover, musician, producer and remixer of Penguin Prison fame
 Jeanne Lee, jazz singer, poet and composer.
 Jack Lewis, musician (known as "Lesser Lewis")
 Gilda Lyons, composer, vocalist, visual artist
 Soul Khan, hip-hop artist
 Patrick Kindlon, musician Self Defense Family, Drug Church
 Michael Montes, composer
 Zeena Parkins, avant-garde harpist
 Steve Vibert Pouchie Latin Jazz
 Daniel Schurgin, musician, Gay Kiss, Soft Shoulder, The Sheaves
 Elliott Sharp, musician
 Richard M. Sherman, songwriter and screenwriter
 Robert B. Sherman, songwriter and screenwriter
 Libby Titus, singer, songwriter and actor
 Jonathan Tunick, composer and arranger
 Stefan Weisman, composer
 PWR BTTM
 Told Slant
 Bruce Wolosoff, composer
 Adam Yauch, musician, Beastie Boys
 Nick Zinner, musician (Yeah Yeah Yeahs, Head Wound City)

Visual Arts
 Sadie Benning, video artist
 Cecilia Berkovic, artist
 Nayland Blake, artist
 Paul Chan, artist
 Ronald Chase, artist, director & educator
 Frances Bean Cobain, visual artist, model & musician
 Adriana Farmiga, visual artist
 Joanne Greenbaum, painter
 David Horvitz, artist
 Jamie Livingston, photographer/cinematographer
 Malerie Marder, photographer
 Lothar Osterburg, printmaker and multimedia artist
 Serkan Ozkaya, artist
 R.H. Quaytman, artist
 Herb Ritts, photographer
 Kristin Schattenfield-Rein, mixed-media artist
 Carolee Schneeman, artist
 Amy Sillman, painter
 Gordon Stevenson, multimedia artist
 Rudi Stern, multimedia artist
 Arthur Tress, photographer
 Tapu Javeri, photographer
 Xaviera Simmons, artist
 Daniel Gordon, artist
 Mary Lum, visual artist
 Robert C.Bassler, multimedia visual artist

Writing
 Jedediah Berry, writer
 Keith Botsford, author, editor, journalist, translator, composer
 Mary Caponegro, writer
 Phyllis Chesler, author
 Chris Claremont, comic book writer (X-Men)
 Cyrus Console, poet and essayist
 Rikki Ducornet, writer
 Andrew Durbin, novelist, editor
 J.F. Englert, author, poet, journalist
 Louise Fitzhugh, author
 Daphne Gottlieb, poet, author
 Ken Grimwood, author
 Anthony Hecht, poet
 Pierre Joris, poet and translator
 Charlotte Mandell, literary translator
 Hal Niedzviecki, novelist
 Albert Jay Nock, author and theorist
 Daniel Pinkwater, children's author, humorist and NPR commentator
 Tad Richards, poet and novelist
 Thomas Rockwell author, How to Eat Fried Worms, Shakespeare Scholar 
 Elizabeth Royte, writer
 Mary Lee Settle, author, won National Book Award
 Rachel Sherman, author
 Juliana Spahr, poet and critic
 Glenn Stout, author, editor, series editor (The Best American Sports Writing)
 Wesley Updike, father of John Updike, inspiration for The Centaur
 Tessa Gräfin von Walderdorff, writer
 John Yau, poet, publisher

Business
 James Cox Chambers
 Asher Edelman, investment banker, served as the basis for the character Gordon Gekko in Wall Street due to his 1985 takeover of Datapoint

Science
 Harvey Bialy, molecular biologist
 László Z. Bitó, scientist and novelist
 John Joseph Bittner, cancer geneticist

Journalism
 Dylan Byers, media reporter
 David Cote, critic and writer
 John Curran, financial journalist
 Michael Deibert, author and journalist
 Mark Ebner, journalist and author
 Ronan Farrow, journalist and author, co-recipient of 2018 Pulitzer Prize for Public Service
 Tim Griffin, curator-in-chief of the Kitchen and editor-in-chief of ArtForum International
 Alexis Papahelas, journalist
 Jonathan Rosenbaum, film critic
 Richard Rovere, journalist, author
 Matt Taibbi, journalist (The Nation, The eXile, The NY Press, Rolling Stone)

Other
 Bruce Chilton, Biblical scholar
 Wayne L. Horvitz, labor mediator.
Tokata Iron Eyes, Native American activist
 Andrew J. Nicholson, scholar of Asian religions
 Susan Playfair (1940-2021), stockbroker, designer, and author
 Gary Robinson, software engineer, graduated 1979, developed anti-spam algorithms
 David Rolf, President of SEIU Local 775
 Bo Bo Nge, Burmese economist, vice governor of the Central Bank of Myanmar, and political prisoner

Faculty
 Peggy Ahwesh
 Diana Al-Hadid
 Thurman Barker
 Jonathan Brent
 Franklin Bruno
 Ian Buruma
 Mary Caponegro
 Caleb Carr
 Anne Carson
 Bruce Chilton
 Teju Cole
 Mark Danner
 Moyra Davey
 Tim Davis
 Jeremy Denk
 John Esposito
 Gidon Eshel
 Barbara Ess
 Elizabeth Frank
 Neil Gaiman
 Kyle Gann
 Jackie Goss
 Benjamin Hale
 Ed Halter
 Michael Hudson 
 Bill T. Jones
 Jeffrey Kahane
 Ani Kavafian
 Ida Kavafian
 Robert Kelly
 So Yong Kim
 Verlyn Klinkenborg
 David Krakauer
 Ann Lauterbach
 An-My Lê
 Gideon Lester
 Erica Lindsay
 Norman Manea
 Walter Russell Mead
 Edie Meidav
 Daniel Mendelsohn
 Peter N. Miller
 Bradford Morrow
 Salahuddin Mustafa Muhammad
 Kamau Amu Patton
 Gilles Peress
 Judy Pfaff
 Francine Prose
 Kelly Reichardt
 Jennifer Ringo
 Lucy Sante
 Peter Serkin
 Stephen Shore
 Amy Sillman
 Mona Simpson
 Michael Specter
 Richard Teitelbaum
 Joan Tower
 George Tsontakis
 Dawn Upshaw
 Laura van den Berg
 Cecelia Watson
 Lawrence Weschler

Former faculty
 Chinua Achebe
 Andre Aciman
 JoAnne Akalaitis
 John Ashbery
 Artine Artinian
 Alfred Jules Ayer
 Bruce Baillie
 Emily Barton
 Bernard Iddings Bell
 Saul Bellow
 Kenneth M. Bilby
 Heinrich Blücher (buried in the Bard Cemetery with his wife, Hannah Arendt)
 Benjamin Boretz
 James Clarke Chace
 Paul de Man
 Jacob Druckman
 Ralph Ellison
 Donald Finkel
 Harvey Fite
 Heinz Insu Fenkl
 
 William Gaddis
 Leah Gilliam
 Karen Greenberg
 Daron Hagen
 Felix Hirsch
 Bob Holman
 William Humphrey
 Peter Hutton
 Mat Johnson
 Joel Kovel
 Harvey J. Levin
 Roy Lichtenstein
 Ken Lum
 Mary McCarthy
 Allan McCollum
 Adolfas Mekas
 Franco Modigliani
 Toni Morrison
 Vik Muniz
 Elizabeth Murray
 Jacob Neusner
 Albert Jay Nock
 Arthur Penn
 Paul Ramirez Jonas
 Orhan Pamuk
 David Rieff
 Roswell Rudd
 Mary Lee Settle
 Isaac Bashevis Singer
 Wadada Leo Smith
 Wilhelm Sollmann
 Joseph Somers
 William Weaver
 Ted Weiss

References

people